The Mill Creek Zanja, also known as the Zankey, is a historic irrigation canal, or zanja, in Redlands, California. The Serrano people dug the canal in 1819 to provide water from Mill Creek for their farms east of the city. The zanja also provided water for the San Bernardino de Sena Estancia mission outpost, which was built near the canal to access its water. The canal's water became a highly desirable resource in the area; it fueled a local agricultural boom and was the subject of several legal disputes over water rights in the 1800s. The City of Redlands covered the western half of the zanja in the 1920s.

The zanja was designated a California Historical Landmark in 1932, named a Historic Civil Engineering Landmark in 1972 and placed on the National Register of Historic Places in 1977. The canal now carries drainage water and storm runoff out of the city; it is the oldest irrigation canal in California which is still in use and the oldest civil engineering project in Southern California. The city, along with several other local groups, is building a trail and greenway alongside the canal.

References

National Register of Historic Places in San Bernardino County, California
Irrigation canals
History of Redlands, California
History of San Bernardino County, California
Historic districts on the National Register of Historic Places in California
Infrastructure completed in 1819
Canals on the National Register of Historic Places in California
Canals in California
Transportation buildings and structures in San Bernardino County, California
California Historical Landmarks